Lake MacDonald may refer to:
Lake Macdonald, Queensland, a suburb of the Sunshine Coast, Queensland
Lake Macdonald, on the border of the Northern Territory and Western Australia
Six Mile Creek Dam, the reservoir of which is known as Lake Macdonald

See also
Lake McDonald (disambiguation)